Azurduy Province (full official name: Província de Juana Azurduy de Padilla) is a province in the Chuquisaca Department in Bolivia. Its seat is the town of Azurduy. It was named in honor of revolutionary guerrilla Juana Azurduy de Padilla.  In the 2012 census it had a population of 24,855.

Geography 
Some of the highest mountains of the province are listed below:

Subdivisions 
The province is divided into two municipalities which are further subdivided into six cantons.

References

Provinces of Chuquisaca Department